Ali Esmaeili (born 19 December 1996) is an Iranian football defender who last played for an Iranian club, Tractor in the Iran Pro League.

References

1996 births
Living people
Iranian footballers
Association football defenders
Tractor S.C. players